Zoltan Istvan Gyurko, professionally known as Zoltan Istvan (born March 30, 1973), is an American transhumanist, journalist, entrepreneur, political candidate, and futurist.

Formerly a reporter for the National Geographic Channel, Istvan now writes futurist, transhumanist, secular and political-themed articles for major media, including The New York Times. He believes transhumanism will grow into a mainstream social movement in this decade. Istvan is the author of The Transhumanist Wager, a philosophical science fiction novel.

In late 2014, Istvan announced he was running for President of the United States in the 2016 election. He ran for his own Transhumanist Party to raise awareness for transhumanist politics issues but did not place his name on any state ballot. Later, in 2017, Istvan ran for Governor of California in the 2018 election as a member of the Libertarian Party. In 2019, Istvan ran for the Republican Party's nomination in the 2020 United States presidential election against President Donald Trump.

Early life and education
Zoltan Istvan was born in Los Angeles in 1973 to his Hungarian immigrant parents Ilona and Steven (István) Gyurko. He was a nationally ranked swimmer and waterpolo player in his youth. Istvan later graduated from Columbia University in New York City with a degree in philosophy and religion. During his freshman year, Istvan was arrested by undercover cops for selling $80 worth of marijuana to fellow students. His arrest and subsequent felony conviction, which was later dismissed and expunged, influenced how he views the U.S. government's war on drugs.

Career

Early career
Istvan was an online and on-camera reporter for the National Geographic Channel. His writings have appeared in a blog of the San Francisco Chronicle, and Outside. His work has been covered in publications such as The Huffington Post. Istvan's coverage of the war in Kashmir was made into a documentary, Pawns of Paradise, distributed by Janson Media. Australia's The Age has acquired non-exclusive Australian rights to the show.

According to Istvan, he invented, pioneered and popularized the extreme sport of volcano boarding.

Istvan is an entrepreneur who works in real estate. He also owns vineyard properties in Mendoza, Argentina, Bordeaux, France, and California's Napa Valley. Istvan owns a 68 acre island in Nova Scotia, Canada in the Atlantic Ocean.

Futurist career
After publishing The Transhumanist Wager, Istvan began actively promoting transhumanism and other futurist issues via speeches, media interviews, activism and his writings.

Istvan's writings and ideas on transhumanism, philosophy, atheism and futurist issues have been featured in major media      Istvan has also written for Gizmodo, New Scientist, Salon, TechCrunch, The Daily Dot, International Business Times Singularity University's Singularity Hub, TechInsider, Newsweek, Futurism and Slate.

Istvan gives talks on futurist and transhumanist topics, which include speeches at the World Bank, World Economic Forum (Global Future Council), Congreso Futuro, Moogfest, the World Future Society's annual conference, and Financial Times Camp Alphaville conference.

He appeared in the 2016 documentary The Future of Work and Death.

2016 presidential campaign
In October 2014, Istvan announced that he was "in the very early stages of preparing a campaign to try to run" for U.S. President in 2016. He stated that his goals would be to support scientists in "overcoming human death and aging within 15–20 years" to encourage Americans to embrace "radical technology and science" and to set up safeguards against dangers including potential abuse of such technology.

In October and November 2014 interviews, Istvan explained that he aimed to unify the transhumanist community, which otherwise was splintered, and to establish a single voice. He said great changes in society could happen and that Transhumanism could provide ideas, safeguards and policies. He said the aim for a Transhumanist Party would be to get onto as many state ballots as possible.

In March 2015, Istvan reported progress in organizing a campaign and explained his wish to get major candidates to address issues. He hoped to be included in some debates, at least with third parties. He himself had funded nearly all of his campaign's expenses to date and he noted donations were needed.

Istvan helped to publicize his campaign in late 2015 by driving a bus shaped like a casket—the "Immortality Bus"—across the United States. Istvan planned the bus tour to raise awareness of life extension. At the end of the Immortality Bus tour, Istvan delivered a "Transhumanist Bill of Rights" to the U.S. Capitol. His 20-point platform includes a universal basic income, increased funding for space travel and taking money from the military and putting it into science and medicine.

In February 2016, it was reported that Istvan was likely to vote Democrat, placing himself "somewhere between Bernie and Hillary in terms of political ideologies", but later in 2016 he also wrote articles supporting Libertarian presidential candidate Gary Johnson. On October 15, 2016, Istvan stated on his social media accounts that he would be voting for himself.

Istvan was not on the ballot in any state, though he claimed to have substantial potential write-in backers.

2018 California gubernatorial campaign
Istvan emphasized science, technology, longevity, transhumanism and Libertarian values in his California gubernatorial run, along with support for basic income. He suggested basic income could be paid for without raising taxes through a "Federal Land Dividend". Under this program, the government would allocate monthly payments to households by leasing out federal land. In his debut editorial for Reason magazine, he argued that reparations for harm caused to marijuana users during the federal government's War on Drugs may be appropriate. He suggested reparations could be paid as tax credits or through the sale of federal lands, so as not to put further burden associated with the drug war on taxpayers.

2020 presidential campaign
In December 2017, Istvan announced he was considering running for the Libertarian Party's Presidential nomination. In March 2019 during an interview on the Bread and Circuses podcast, Istvan told Caleb Salvatore and Nick Koehler that he was again considering a run for President. Istvan announced a run for the Republican nomination on November 19.

Philosophy
Istvan states that in the 21st century, as modern man confronts the finitude of life, everyone faces a Transhumanist Wager, a concept that is explored in his science fiction novel of the same name. The Transhumanist Wager follows from a life philosophy Istvan calls Teleological Egocentric Functionalism (TEF). Istvan summarizes the Transhumanist Wager as follows:

Istvan is the creator of the concepts of Theistcideism, Omnipotism, the AI Imperative, the Singularity Disparity, Speciation Syndrome, Post-earthism, Delayed Fertility Advantage, and Jethro's Window, a possible solution to the Fermi Paradox. Istvan is also a populizer of AI Day, the transhumanist olympics, the Jesus Singularity, cryothanasia a robot AI President, and quantum archaeology (technological resurrection). Istvan proposed and developed the concept of a Longevity Peace Prize at the XPRIZE Foundation in 2019. Writing for The New York Times opinion section, Istvan argued conservatives should consider supporting artificial wombs to move the abortion debate forward. Istvan also argued to allow surfing during the Covid lockdowns in The New York Times Opinion section.

Istvan authored an article entitled "Transhumanism and Theistcideism" for publication in Pandeism: An Anthology (2017). Istvan wrote the short fictional story "The Jesus Singularity" on a religious AI that goes rogue and destroys the world. It was published in Vice magazine.

Istvan has a chip implanted in his hand and consulted with the U.S. Navy on broad about the use of the implant in humans. According to Istvan's novel, the three laws of Transhumanism are:

 A transhumanist must safeguard one's own existence above all else.
 A transhumanist must strive to achieve omnipotence as expediently as possible—so long as one's actions do not conflict with the First Law.
 A transhumanist must safeguard value in the universe—so long as one's actions do not conflict with the First and Second Laws.

Transhumanist community reception
Within the transhumanist community, reactions to Istvan's U.S. Transhumanist Party have ranged from enthusiastic to sharply critical. Some transhumanist critics, such as Peter Rothman, have questioned whether the Transhumanist Party adds value to the overall goals of transhumanism.

Personal life
Istvan resides in Mill Valley, California with his wife, who is a physician, and his daughters. He identifies as an atheist.

In February 2015, he helped launch BiZoHa, the world's first free-thinker orphanage, in Mukhoya, Kasese district, western Uganda. Istvan's promotional article on the topic in Vice's Motherboard, helped a GoFundMe campaign to achieve success in raising $5,820 to provide funding for the orphanage.

References

External links
 Zoltan Istvan's personal site
 Transhumanist Party's website
 Zoltan Istvan's 2020 campaign site
 

1973 births
Living people
21st-century American male writers
21st-century American novelists
21st-century American non-fiction writers
21st-century American politicians
American atheism activists
American male non-fiction writers
American male novelists
American people of Hungarian descent
American political party founders
American transhumanists
Atheist philosophers
California Libertarians
Candidates in the 2016 United States presidential election
Candidates in the 2018 United States elections
Candidates in the 2020 United States presidential election
Columbia College (New York) alumni
Life extensionists
Philosophers from California
Transhumanist politicians
Writers from Los Angeles